Saintes (Poitevin-Saintongeais: Sénte) is a commune and historic town in western France, in the Charente-Maritime department of which it is a sub-prefecture, in Nouvelle-Aquitaine. Its inhabitants are called Saintaises and Saintais. Saintes is the second-largest city in Charente-Maritime, with  inhabitants in 2008. The city's immediate surroundings form the second-most populous metropolitan area in the department, with  inhabitants. While a majority of the surrounding landscape consists of fertile, productive fields, a significant minority of the region remains forested, its natural state.

In Roman times, Saintes was known as Mediolanum Santonum. During much of its history, the name of the city was spelled Xaintes or Xainctes.

Primarily built on the left bank of the Charente, Saintes became the first Roman capital of Aquitaine. Later it was designated as the capital of the province of Saintonge under the Ancien Régime. Following the French Revolution, it briefly became the prefecture of the department (then called Charente-Inférieure) during the territorial reorganization of 1790, until La Rochelle was designated and superseded it in 1810. Although it only had the status of a subprefecture, Saintes was allowed to remain the judicial center of the department. In the late 19th century, Saintes was chosen as the seat of the VIIIth arrondissement of the Chemins de Fer de l'État, railways, which enabled an era of economic and demographic growth.

Today, Saintes remains the economic heart of the center of the department, and it is an important transportation hub. A few major industrial businesses operate (in electronics, rail repair, construction of hoists). The city's commerce and service sector is large, featuring the headquarters of Coop Atlantique, and administrative functions of state, courts, and legal services; banks, schools, and a hospital. Beyond this, property maintenance, retail, and tourism sectors provide large numbers of jobs.

Because of its noteworthy Gallo-Roman, medieval and classical heritage, Saintes is a tourist destination. It has been a member of the French Towns and Lands of Art and History since 1990. It has several museums, a theater, cinemas, and organizes numerous festivals. A European center of musical research and practice is in its Abbaye aux Dames.

Geography

Location 

Saintes is on the banks of the river Charente, in the center-eastern part of the department. The city is based 60 km southeast of La Rochelle, 33 kilometers northeast of Royan, and about 100 km north of Bordeaux (to which it is linked by the A10 autoroute).

Geology 
A chronostratigraphic stage of sedimentary rock (in stratigraphy) has been named after the former name for inhabitants, the Santones, the Santonian (approximately 84 Ma ago, after the Coniacian Age and before the Campanian Age in the Cretaceous Period). Saintes is built on its eponymous subset of mainly limestone that consists of particular flint nodules of quartz geodes and nodules of iron. Ancient stone quarries in its 'Colline de la Capitole' (Capitol Hill) and Bellevue, partially filled or converted to permit fungiculture, are evidence for Santonian stone's use in the construction of various buildings, where unimproved quite vulnerable to frost.

Nearer to the river, the Cretaceous plateau gives way to more or less recent alluvial grasslands composed of bri, a type of clay.

The uplifting of Alps and Pyrenees began during the Maastrichtian, 65 Ma ago, and continued for a part of the Paleogene.

Districts 

The town is divided into 14 administrative areas : Les Boiffiers, Les Tourneurs, L'Ormeau de Pied, Recouvrance, La Fenêtre, Saint-Rémy, Saint-Vivien, Saint-Eutrope, Saint-Pierre, Saint-Pallais, Saint-Sébastien de Bouard, La Récluse, Le Maine-Saint-Sorlin and Bellevue.

Left bank (Rive gauche) 

The neighborhood of Saint-Pierre lies between the hill of the Capitole and the river Charente. Built around the cathedral Saint-Pierre, the place du marché and the place du Synode, it is crossed by pedestrian alleys around which can be found numerous medieval, renaissance and classic buildings.

Almost immediately west lies the neighbourhood of Saint-Eutrope, that has developed over the centuries around a rocky elevation bounded by two small valleys at right angles to the river. Dominated by the Saint-Eutrope basilica, it also contains the remains of a Clunian priory and several hillside houses. Little valleys lead to the vallon des Arènes (meaning arenas vale) below, where a Roman amphiteatre survives, in a park named "Parc des Arènes".

The cours Reverseaux and cours des Apôtres de la liberté separate Saint-Eutrope (and its hill) in the west from the faubourg Berthonnière. These partly separate the hill of the Capitole to the north. Once outside-of-the-walls, the faubourg included some hostelries and inns for pilgrims. The streets of the faubourg converge toward the place Saint-Louis, the place de l'Aubarrée and the place Blair, dominated by a column of Liberty (in France popularised as fictional Marianne at the time) erected during the Revolution. The square Goulebenéze stands between the place Blair and the river.

The neighbourhoods of les Boiffiers and Bellevue are separated from the rest of the city by the avenue de Saintonge; they consist mainly in low-rent housing (HLM) and suburban housing standing on a plateau bounded by the Charente. Bellevue has  inhabitants and spans ; it is listed as a zone urbaine sensible (ZUS).

La Recouvrance, in a triangle formed by the cours du maréchal Leclerc, the cours Genet and the rocade ouest (bypass), contains a lycée, the former seminary, the Yvon Chevalier stadium and a shopping mall. The water tower of Recouvrance is decorated with frescoes by contemporary artist Michel Genty.

The north of the urban area, the Saint-Vivien neighborhood has an old faubourg (exurb) inhabited since antiquity where the thermes de Saint-Saloine, ancient Roman baths are found.

Right bank (Rive droite) 

The neighborhood of Saint-Pallais was probably urbanized in antiquity. Structured around the main access way of the Roman city, it was then linked to the town center by a bridge with a monumental entrance, the Arch of Germanicus. During the Middle Ages, a funeral basilica, dedicated to the bishop Palladius, was established (and later replaced by the église Saint-Pallais, which gives its name to the neighborhood), then a Benedictine abbey of women amongst the largest in the region, the Abbaye aux Dames de Saintes. The presence of this monumental heritage led to the integration of part of the neighborhood in a conservation area. It was during the 19th century that the neighborhood began to develop. The antique bridge was destroyed and replaced in 1879 by the pont Bernard-Palissy, a few meters upstream ; the avenue Gambetta and the place Bassompierre are created ; the train station, the Gare de Saintes, the prison, the Haras national de Saintes, the parc Pierre-Mendès France, the Jardin public Fernand Chapsal and the protected area of the prairie de la Palu were subsequently created.

Adjacent communes

Transportation

Roads 

Saintes is a transportation hub of some importance, connected by two motorways and several secondary roads, national and departmental, that converge towards the rocade (partly a 2x2) that bypasses the city on its western and southern sides.

The A10 autoroute (France), operated locally by Autoroutes du Sud de la France, passes through the commune in its western part, in a north–south axis. It can be accessed by the interchange 35.

The A837 autoroute is a spur road of the A10 linking the area to Rochefort, the third city in the department.

Saintes is on the Route Centre-Europe Atlantique, an expressway that links it to Limoges and Lyon in the east – its dualled western section Saintes-Saujon opened to traffic in 2008 making the two 25 minutes apart by car. An extension towards Royan on the coast completed in the following decade.

The rocade is formed in its western part by the national road 137, that meets two key roads, the departmental road 728 (that links Saintes to the Island of Oleron by Marennes) and the departmental road 150 that intersects near the locality of Diconche. In its southern part, the rocade integrates the national road 141, that runs east towards Cognac, Angoulême and Limoges. The departmental road 150, at the end of the east part, runs towards Niort by Saint-Hilaire-de-Villefranche et Saint-Jean-d'Angély. The town center of Saintes is bypassed by the avenue de Saintonge or departmental road 24, that crosses the Charente with the bridge de Saintonge, opened in 1969.

Train 
The Gare de Saintes (train station) is at the focal point of five railways that link the agglomeration to Nantes (by La Rochelle), Bordeaux, Angoulême, Niort and Royan ; the trains are mainly part of the regional rail network TER Nouvelle-Aquitaine and the network Intercités.

The importance of this railway network is explained by the designation of Saintes as the seat of the Compagnie des chemins de fer des Charentes in 1867, then as the regional seat of the VIIIth arrondissement of the Chemins de fer de l'État from 1911 to 1971. The SNCF is still a major employer in the city, and new depots and workshops have been opened in 2009 and 2010.

Population

Landmarks 

The Arch of Germanicus, a triumphal arch, was built at the entrance to a bridge, where the main Roman road crossed the Charente. The bridge was demolished in 1843 but the Arch was saved by Prosper Mérimée and rebuilt at its present location on the bank of the river.
Ruins of the Roman amphitheatre on the main, left bank of the Charente, near the summit of the hill upon which the town was built. Its notable tiers (cavea) are built against the hill and an embankment.
Some remnants of the thermae of Saint-Saloine (1st century) are also visible, in particular an aqueduct.
Fragments of the third century rampart (to the city walls) can be seen in the Place des Récollets. It was built with stones taken from the Roman buildings.
Ecclesiastical
The Abbaye-aux-Dames. Madame de Montespan was educated here.
Other churches: the Basilique Saint-Eutrope (Basilica of Saint Eutropius) and the Cathédrale Saint-Pierre, Saintes Cathedral:  Basilique Saint-Eutrope: ,
Museums
 the Musée archéologique, which has a restored Roman cart/wagon of the first century amongst a collection of sculptures and inscriptions.
 the Musée du Présidial, which has a mannerist architecture and a collection of regional ceramics and paintings of the 15th to 18th century.
 the Musée de l'Échevinage, which exhibits porcelain of Sèvres and paintings of the 19th and 20th century

Hospital 

The hospital of Saintes is the most important hospital center of the department of Charente-Maritime

Education 

Saintes is in the catchment of and under the auspices of the académie de Poitiers.

 Two U.S. universities conduct year round study abroad programs at the C.E.A.U., the University of Houston's Gerald D. Hines College of Architecture, and the University of Southern California.

Local TV channels 

Saintes is served by France 3 Nouvelle-Aquitaine.

Twin towns – sister cities
Saintes is twinned with:

 Nivelles, Belgium
 Xanten, Germany
 Timbuktu, Mali
 Vladimir, Russia
 Salisbury, England, United Kingdom
 Cuevas del Almanzora, Spain

See also 
 Saintongeais language
Communes of the Charente-Maritime department

Notes

References

Bibliography 
  André Baudrit, Saintes au XVIth siècle, (Thèse de Doctorat, Bordeaux 1957), 745 pages.
  Jean Combes, Gilles Bernard, Histoire du Poitou et des Pays Charentais, Éditions de Borée, 2001 
  Robert Favreau, Régis Rech et Yves-Jean Riou (directeurs) Bonnes villes du Poitou et des Pays Charentais (XIIth–XVIIIth siècles), Actes du colloque tenu à Saint-Jean-d’Angély les 24-25 septembre 1999, Société des antiquaires de l'Ouest in Mémoires de la Société des antiquaires de l'Ouest et des Musées de Poitiers, fifth série, tome VIII (2002), à Poitiers. 
  Michel Garnier, Christian Gensbeit, À la découverte de Saintes, Patrimoines Médias, 2000, 
  Daniel Massiou, Histoire politique, civile et religieuse de la Saintonge et de l'Aunis, A.Charrier, libraire-éditeur, Saintes, 1846.
  Alain Michaud (sous la direction de), Histoire de Saintes, Privat, 1989, 
  Pierre Rayssiguier (ouvrage collectif sous la direction de), Saintes, plus de  ans d'histoire illustrée, Société d'archéologie et d'histoire de la Charente-Maritime, Saintes, 2001
  Henri Texier, Petite histoire de Saintes, Geste édition, 2003 
  Le patrimoine des communes de la Charente-Maritime, éditions Flohic, collection Le patrimoine des communes de France, 2002.

External links 

 Saintes History: Urban Development
  Town council site
  Tourism office site
  Pictures of the Abbaye aux Dames
  Pictures of Saint-Eutrope church:  and 

 
Communes of Charente-Maritime
Subprefectures in France
World Heritage Sites in France
Santones
Gallia Aquitania
County of Saintonge
Cities in Nouvelle-Aquitaine